The Key deer (Odocoileus virginianus clavium) is an endangered deer that lives only in the Florida Keys. It is a subspecies of the white-tailed deer (O. virginianus). It is the smallest extant North American deer species.

Description
This deer can be recognized by its characteristic size, smaller than all other white-tailed deer. The deer is a reddish-brown to grey-brown in color. Antlers are grown by males and shed between February and March and regrown by June. When the antlers are growing, they have a white velvet coating. The subspecies otherwise generally resembles other white-tailed deer in appearance.

Behavior
Key deer easily swim between islands. Living close to humans, they have little of the natural fear of man shown by most of their larger mainland relatives (an example of island tameness).  The deer are often found in residents' yards and along roadsides where plants and flowers grow.  This often results in car-to-deer collisions, as the deer are more active (and harder to avoid) at night.  Seeing them at dusk and dawn is not unusual.

Breeding occurs all year, but peaks in October and December. Territorial activity is limited to defending a receptive doe from other bucks. Longevity records are 9 years for males and 7 years for females. Adult females form loose matriarchal groups with one or two generations of offspring, while bucks feed and bed together only outside the breeding season.

Range, habitat, and diet

The range of the Key deer originally encompassed all of the lower Florida Keys (where standing water pools exist), but is now limited to a stretch of the Florida Keys from about Sugarloaf Key to Bahia Honda Key. Key deer use all islands during the wet season when drinking water is more generally available, retreating to islands with a perennial supply of fresh water in dry months. By August 2019, most individuals were living on only one of the Florida Key islands, Big Pine Key.

Key deer inhabit nearly all habitats within their range, including pine rocklands, hardwood hammocks, mangroves, and freshwater wetlands. The species feeds on over 150 types of plants, but mangroves (red, white, and black) and thatch palm berries make up the most important parts of their diets. Pine rockland habitat is important, as well, because it is often the only reliable source of fresh drinking water (Key deer can tolerate drinking only mildly brackish water). Habitat destruction due to human encroachment causes many deer to feed on non-native ornamental plants.

History
The Key deer is a subspecies of white-tailed deer which migrated to the Florida Keys from the mainland over a land bridge during the Wisconsin glaciation. The earliest known written reference to Key deer comes from the writings of Hernando de Escalante Fontaneda, a Spanish sailor shipwrecked in the Florida Keys and captured by Native Americans in the 1550s.

Endangered status
Key deer were hunted as a food supply by native tribes, passing sailors, and early settlers. Hunting them was banned in 1939, but widespread poaching and habitat destruction caused the subspecies to plummet to near-extinction by the 1950s. The National Key Deer Refuge, a federally administered National Wildlife Refuge operated by the Wildlife Service, was established in 1957.

Recent population estimates put the population between 700 and 800, putting it on the list of endangered species. Road kills from drivers on US 1, which traverses the deer's small range, are also a major threat, averaging between 125 and 150 kills per year, 70% of the annual mortality.

The population has been impacted by the fragmentation, destruction and degradation of its habitat, generally due to urbanization. Human feeding of deer has also proven problematic, as the animals become dependent on this food source. Fences have become an obstacle to migration and dispersal.

However, the population has made an encouraging rise since 1955, when population estimates ranged as low as 25, and appears to have stabilized in recent years. Still, recent human encroachment into the fragile habitat and the deer's relatively low rate of reproduction point to an uncertain future for the subspecies. In August 2019 the USFWS recommended that the Key deer be "delisted due to recovery".

Screw worm infestation
In September 2016, a screw worm infestation was discovered (the first infestation of its kind in the U.S. since 1982) to be affecting the Key deer population, necessitating the euthanasia of affected animals. The screw worm is a fly larva that enters an open wound of a live animal and eats the flesh of the animal from within, leading to a gruesome death. The female fly mates once in her life, so the infestation can be battled by introducing sterile male flies to the population, causing the females to die out without laying fertile eggs. Other steps to battle the outbreak included injecting deer with antiparasitic drugs, fencing off healthy sections of the population, and tracking a portion of deer with radio collars. The pest was declared as eradicated in April 2017. The outbreak killed 135 deer, roughly an eighth of the herd.

Conservation efforts
Not all of the refuge lands are protected as public lands; despite extensive efforts of the refuge to purchase these private habitat lands for protection in the refuge, about  currently remain in private ownership and can potentially be developed. About  of this privately developable land is on Big Pine Key and No Name Key, which are the central population areas for the deer.
In 2006, a habitat conservation plan was enacted by Monroe County and the US Fish and Wildlife Service, which will limit development in primary habitat and provide for additional habitat purchases over the next 15 years. Thus, while the short term promises some cushion from extinction, the long-term prospects for the deer remain in doubt.

A portion of U.S. Route 1 was also elevated in 2003 to allow the deer to pass safely beneath the roadway, in an attempt to lessen the chance of road kills. However, no decrease in total traffic deaths has been seen.

The National Key Deer Refuge encourages people to help keep the Key deer wild by not feeding them.  Feeding acclimates them to humans and vehicles, and makes them more likely to be hit and killed by vehicles.  Also, hanging around people and developed areas in higher than normal densities makes them more susceptible to diseases, dog attacks, and entanglements in human trash, all of which can lead to increased injuries or death. On August 2019, the USFWS initiated a discussion for removing key deer from the Endangered status given its improved numbers and elevated status, but the initiative did not reach any final conclusion.

References

Further reading 
  Listed as Endangered (EN D v2.3)
Authorities: Habitat Conservation Plan, 2006; FWS Biological Opinion on NFIP, August 2008

External links

National Fish and Wildlife Service species account
National Key Deer Refuge site
Key Deer Research Project
Key Deer Information
Key Deer at floridaconservation.org

White-tailed deer
Mammals described in 1922
Florida Keys
Monroe County, Florida
Endemic fauna of Florida
Islands of Florida
Taxa named by Glover Morrill Allen
ESA endangered species
Subspecies